Courthouses in New South Wales were designed by the Colonial Architect, later known as the Government Architect of New South Wales, Australia.

History of New South Wales Local Courts
The first New South Welsh Charter of Justice of 2 April 1787 created the power to convene a criminal court. This was the Court of Criminal Jurisdiction. The first Charter of Justice also created a Court of Civil Jurisdiction to hear and determine in a summary way all pleas relating to real and personal property, debts, contracts, grant of probates and to administer intestate estates.  Magistrates appointed in the early years of the colony were unpaid honorary appointments. The first paid magistrate was D'Arcy Wentworth appointed in 1810.

Local Courts were known as Courts of Petty Sessions.  Such courts had originated in England in the fourteenth century. Although during the early years of the colony references are made to Courts of Petty Session sittings by Magistrates, it was not until 1832 that Courts of Petty Sessions were formally established in New South Wales.

The first Courts of Petty Sessions were proclaimed in the Government Gazette of 3 October 1832. The proclamations gave notice that Courts of Petty Sessions were to be held at the following locations: Sydney (Police Office and Hyde Park Barracks), Inverary, 
Parramatta, Bathurst, Windsor, Newcastle, Penrith, Paterson's Plains, Liverpool, Maitland, Campbelltown, Darlington, Wollongong, Invermein, Stonequarry Creek, Port Stephens, Bong Bong or Berrima, Port Macquarie, Goulburn Plains.

More than three hundred courthouses have been built in New South Wales since settlement. The oldest existing Local Court in New South Wales is the Local Court at Windsor which was built in 1821.

In 1985 the Local Courts Act abolished Courts of Petty Sessions by changing their name to Local Courts and appointments are now made under that Act. There are currently 160 Local Courts established throughout New South Wales and 130 Magistrates appointed.

Current role
Local Courts in New South Wales have jurisdiction to deal with:

 most criminal and summary prosecutions
 civil matters with a monetary value of up to $60,000
 committal hearings
 family law matters
 child care proceedings
 juvenile prosecutions and care matters
 coronial inquiries
 industrial matters
 mining matters

Local Courts also provide the following services:

Court Registries administer the sittings of the Local Court and provide registry services to the Court's clients.
The Chamber Magistrate provides information about legal options and court proceedings, but cannot represent people appearing before the Court. In smaller Courts, the Chamber Magistrate service is often provided by the Clerk of the Court.
Coroners hold inquests into deaths and inquiries into fires. Outside the metropolitan area, most Clerks of the Local Court are appointed as Coroners for the State. Within the metropolitan area, appointed coroners sit at the Coroner's Court of New South Wales in Glebe.
Marriage Celebrant: Clerks of the Local Court at most country registries (and some larger metropolitan registries) are authorised to perform marriages.
Licensing: Most major country and outer metropolitan registries process applications for and issue certain licences such as a liquor licence or commercial agents licence.

Partial list of courthouse buildings of New South Wales
The following courthouses are located in New South Wales, with the Colonial Architect James Barnet and his office responsible for designing and building 130 courthouses across the state. Some of the courthouses designed by Barnet replaced existing courthouses where it was deemed the building had been outgrown:

Courthouses in current use

Former courthouses

References

External links

 
New South Wales
Lists of buildings and structures in New South Wales